Kirshenbaum , sometimes called ASCII-IPA or erkIPA, is a system used to represent the International Phonetic Alphabet (IPA) in ASCII. This way it allows typewriting IPA-symbols by regular keyboard. It was developed for Usenet, notably the newsgroups sci.lang and alt.usage.english. It is named after Evan Kirshenbaum, who led the collaboration that created it.  The eSpeak open source software speech synthesizer uses the Kirshenbaum scheme.

Comparison of Kirshenbaum with X-SAMPA

The system uses almost all lower-case letters to represent the directly corresponding IPA character, but unlike X-SAMPA, has the notable exception of the letter 'r'. Examples where the two systems have a different mapping between characters and sounds are:

Kirshenbaum charts of consonants and vowels
This chart is based on information provided in the Kirshenbaum specification. It may also be helpful to compare it to the SAMPA chart or X-SAMPA chart.

Consonant chart

The IPA consonant chart, for comparison, uses many symbols that are less widely supported:

Vowel chart

The IPA vowel chart, by comparison, uses many symbols that are less widely supported:

Vowel modifiers and diacritics
Modifiers and diacritics follow the symbol they modify.

Background
The Kirshenbaum system started developing in August 1992 through a usenet group, after "being fed up with describing the sound of words by using other words".
It should be usable for both phonemic and narrow phonetic transcription.
 It should be possible to represent all symbols and diacritics in the IPA.
 The previous guideline notwithstanding, it is expected that (as in the past) most use will be in transcribing English, so where tradeoffs are necessary, decisions should be made in favor of ease of representation of phonemes which are common in English.
 The representation should be readable.
 It should be possible to mechanically translate from the representation to a character set which includes IPA. The reverse would also be nice.

The developers decided to use the existing IPA alphabet, mapping each segment to a single keyboard character, and adding extra ASCII characters optionally for IPA diacritics.

An early (1993), different set in ASCII was derived from the pronunciation guide in Merriam-Webster's New Collegiate Dictionary, which uses straight letters to describe the sound.

Kirshenbaum's document, Representing IPA phonetics in ASCII, is commonly used as an example of an "IPA ASCII" system.

The eSpeak software speech synthesizer uses the Kirshenbaum scheme to represent phonemes with ascii characters.

Encoding
IETF language tags have registered  as a variant subtag identifying text as transcribed in this convention.

Notes and references

Notes

References

External links
 Kirshenbaum specification (PDF file)
 Tutorial and guide with sound samples
 History

Phonetic alphabets
ASCII
International Phonetic Alphabet